Methyltestosterone 3-hexyl ether (brand names Androgénol, Enoltestovis, Enoltestovister), or 17α-methyltestosterone 3-hexyl enol ether, also known as 17α-methylandrost-3,5-dien-17β-ol-3-one 3-hexyl ether, is a synthetic anabolic-androgenic steroid and an androgen ether – specifically, the 3-hexyl ether of methyltestosterone.

See also
 Penmesterol (methyltestosterone 3-cyclopentyl enol ether)

References

Abandoned drugs
Androgen ethers
Androgens and anabolic steroids
Androstanes
Hepatotoxins
Prodrugs
Tertiary alcohols